Umma is a 1960 Malayalam social drama film directed and produced by Kunchacko. It was the first directorial venture of Kunchacko. Its screenplay is written by Vimal while the dialogues are by P. K. Sarangapani, who was on his debut. The film is based on the novel of the same name by Moidu Padiyath. It was the first Muslim social film in Malayalam. The story of the film revolves around marital evils that prevailed in the Muslim community, particularly in the Malabar region.

The film was a box office success and gained critical praise. The famous song "Kadalivaazhakayyilirunnu" is from this film.

Plot
Polygamy is the theme of the film. An illiterate rich landlord Aboobacker Haji married three times and divorced all the three wives. His next aim is to get married again which according to traditions will be his last marriage. He marries Ibrahim Kakka's daughter Ayisha. Ayisha gives birth to a daughter and a maid servant named Khadeeja is appointed to take care of the child.

Haji eventually develops a desire to marry Khadeeja. Though this was against custom, nobody was dare to question him. Haji divorces Ayisha, who seeks refuge in Ibrahim Kakka's house. She sends her daughter Zainaba to school ignoring protests from the community. Zainaba falls in love with her classmate Hameed. When Haji learns of this affair, he tries to take his daughter with him, which is opposed by Ayisha and Ibrahim Kakka. They decide to conduct the marriage of Zainaba with Hameed. The marriage did not take place as Haji interrupted. Haji takes Zainaba to his house where she faces tortures from her stepmother Khadeeja.

Meanwhile, Ibrahim Kakka dies. Haji arranges Zainaba's marriage with a rich jewellery shop owner. Haji's mother Pathumma comes to the help of her granddaughter. She pleads with the Haji to change his decision. At this moment in time Haji learns of Khadeeja's cruel tricks. His heart melts and he withdraws from his decision. In the end, Zainaba marries Hameed.

Cast
 Thikkurissy Sukumaran Nair as Abobacker Haji
 B. S. Saroja as Ayisha
 Rajakumari as Zainaba
 K. P. Ummer as Hameed
 K. Sadanandan as Ibrahim Kakka
 Kanchana as Khadeeja
 S. P. Pillai as Vattathil Kurup, the crooked manager of Haji
 L. Ponnamma as Pathumma, Haji's mother
 Bahadur
 S. J. Dev
 Rajamma
 Nirmala Devi
 Changanasseri Thankam
 T. V. Mathew
 Krishnakumari
 Pushpam
 Alex
 P. B. Pillai

Soundtrack

References

External links
 

1964 drama films
1964 films
1960s Malayalam-language films
1960 directorial debut films
1960 films
Films directed by Kunchacko
Indian drama films
1960 drama films